Bondivali is a small village in Ratnagiri district, Maharashtra state in Western India.

Population
The 2011 Census of India recorded a total of 537 residents in the village.

Geography

References

Villages in Ratnagiri district